Bezławki  is a village in the administrative district of Gmina Reszel, within Kętrzyn County, Warmian-Masurian Voivodeship, in northern Poland.

A watermill probably existed in the village already in 1356. The Germans built a small Ordensburg or castle at the site in the 14th century, as a defense against Lithuanian raids. The castle, located on a hill and easily accessible only from the north, was in 1583 converted into an Evangelical church. A church tower was built in 1726–28. The interior of the church was completely refurnished in 1884.

The village has a population of 122.

References

Bibliography

Villages in Kętrzyn County
Castles of the Teutonic Knights